Pamela J. Marshall (born 31 May 1954) is an American horn player and composer. She was born in Beverly, Massachusetts, and studied horn, electronic music and conducting at the Eastman and Yale Schools of Music. After completing her education, she settled in Lexington, Massachusetts. She plays French horn in orchestra and composes for synthesizer, brass, mandolin and orchestra.  Since 2015, she has been a key participant in The k a rl h e nn i ng Ensemble (Boston), both as hornist and composer.

Marshall has written software and developed sounds for Kurzweil Music Systems and worked at Powersoft Corporation as a technical writer. She established her own music publishing company, Spindrift Music.

Selected works
Marshall composes chamber, vocal and orchestral music.
Colored Leaves for solo horn (1964)
Hillslide for brass quintet and alphorn solo (1992)
Spindrift (1974)
Nautilus (1975)
 Meditations for organ (2005) 
Summer into Winter for clarinet (2007)
Rising for viola solo (2009)
Shepherds and Angels for mixed choir SATB, violin & harp (2010)
Samurai Song on a text by Robert Pinsky for soprano, flute & piano (2018)
Birds on the Harmonic Plain for 2 fl (fl 1 doubling on picc), cl, hn & fixed media (2018)

Discography
Her music has been recorded and issued on CD, including:
Ghosts: Solos and Duets (2009) Beauport Classics, ASIN: B0049YJSBU
Through the Mist (2015) Ravello Records RR7901, ASIN: B00RLXVX9G

References

1954 births
Living people
20th-century classical composers
21st-century classical composers
American women classical composers
American classical composers
American classical horn players
Women horn players
People from Beverly, Massachusetts
Eastman School of Music alumni
Yale School of Music alumni
21st-century American composers
20th-century American women musicians
20th-century American composers
21st-century American women musicians
Classical musicians from Massachusetts
20th-century women composers
21st-century women composers